Charlotte Hammans (born 18 March 2001) is an Australian rules footballer playing for the Carlton Football Club in the AFL Women's (AFLW).

Early football
Hammans was named in the initial squad of the 2018 Under 18s All Australian team after kicking 4 goals in 5 games in the 2018 AFL Women's Under 18 Championships.

AFL career
She made her debut against  at Ikon Park in the opening round of the 2021 season.

Statistics  
Statistics are correct to the end of round 3, 2021. 

|- style="background:#EAEAEA"
| scope="row" text-align:center | 2020
| 
| - || - || - || - || - || - || - || - || - || - || - || - || - || - || - || - || -
|- 
| scope="row" text-align:center | 2021
| 
| 17 || 2 || 0 || 0 || 7 || 4 || 11 || 1 || 5 || 0.0 || 0.0 || 3.5 || 2.0 || 5.5 || 0.5 || 2.5 || 
|- class="sortbottom"
! colspan=3 | Career
! 2
! 0
! 0
! 7
! 4
! 11
! 1
! 5
! 0.0
! 0.0 
! 3.5
! 2.0 
! 5.5
! 0.5
! 2.5
! 0
|}

Honours and Achievements
Initial Squad - AFL Women's Under 18 Championships member (2019)

References

External links

2000 births
Living people
Carlton Football Club (AFLW) players
Australian rules footballers from Victoria (Australia)
Murray Bushrangers players (NAB League Girls)